Spelunker II: Yūsha e no Chōsen is a Japan-exclusive action video game released for the Family Computer in 1987.

Despite being titled as a sequel to Spelunker, Spelunker II: Yūsha e no Chōsen features vastly different gameplay. There was a separate arcade sequel, titled Spelunker II: 23 no Kagi, which features similar gameplay to the first Spelunker game as well. The two Spelunker II games are separate entries in the series and are not related.

Gameplay

Geyla took over Fairy Land in a massive demon invasion one thousand years ago and continues to rule it with an iron grip. A viewpoint similar to Ganbare Goemon is utilized; allowing players to go in four different directions.

The player controls an anonymous treasure hunter who seeks treasure within Fairy Land. Unlike most video game characters, the player is an antihero who is unsure whether to liberate Fairy Land or simply become rich from all their treasures. Actions in the game will ultimately influence how the story ends. Lava fields along with bottomless pits and scattered enemies will make life tough for the player. There are also some bosses that appear at the end of each respective stage.

Two distinct meters keep track of the character's well-being in the game; a "life" meter helps to govern the player's stamina while a "Toku" meter helps to govern the player's morality level. Killing undead creatures improves the player's "Toku" rating. Players can choose from three character classes: explorer, clergy or esper. While the explorer is basically a variation from the original Spelunker character, the Esper is an adept magic user with the ability to throw thunderbolts while the clergy member can shoot out fireballs at the enemy. The number of days that have elapsed in-game in addition to the current in-game time is included and is vital for certain tasks. If the player falls down a pit while having a high "Toku" rating; he is revived at a minimum cost. Suffering that same fate with a low "Toku" meter causes the player to descend to eternal damnation in Hell; thus ending the game.

Reception

In Japan, Game Machine listed the arcade version of Spelunker II: 23 no Kagi on their October 15, 1986 issue as being the seventeenth most-successful table arcade unit of the month.

Notes

References

Spelunker (video game)
1987 video games
Irem games
Japan-exclusive video games
Nintendo Entertainment System games
Nintendo Entertainment System-only games
Now Production games
Platform games
Side-scrolling video games
Video games developed in Japan
Single-player video games